Joaquín Parra may refer to:

 Joaquín Parra (footballer) (born 1961), Spanish football manager and former player
 Joaquín Parra (actor) (died 2022), Spanish actor